Jean-Jules Bourguignon (29 August 1926 in Latinne – 10 May 1981 in (Neupré)) was a Belgian inventor. Having left school at the age of 16, he had a variety of jobs while developing his inventing skills.

He invented about 50 items in the 1960s, some of which are still being used today, like the first perpetual movement watch; the first remote control toy car; the first radio alarm clock and a special camera lens which produced three-dimensional pictures and films.

He was featured in the Paris Match Benelux in February 1962 and was awarded a medal in the Salon des Inventeurs of Brussels in the early sixties.

He had one daughter, Marie-Jeanne from his first wife Marie-Josée Velter.
He was married to Simonne Courtoy and they had two children, Françoise, an artist, and Yolande.

1926 births
1981 deaths
People from Liège Province
20th-century Belgian inventors